Catherine Terese MacArthur (née Hyland; November 23, 1908 – December 15, 1981) was an American philanthropist. With the estate of her husband, businessman and philanthropist John D. MacArthur, she co-founded the MacArthur Foundation, one of the 10 largest philanthropic foundations in the United States.

Life
Born Catherine Terese Hyland in 1908, MacArthur was one of nine children of Irish immigrants on Chicago's South Side. Her father owned and operated several retail stores, was active in Democratic politics in Chicago, and held several state and local governmental positions.

In 1938 she married John D. MacArthur. In 1935, MacArthur purchased Bankers Life and Casualty for $2,500 and used mass marketing techniques to sell insurance by mail.

Banker's Life was the basis of John's phenomenal success in real estate and insurance. Official Banker's Life press releases verify that Catherine was intimately involved in the business's success. She appears throughout the records under her maiden name, C.T. Hyland, as corporate secretary, director, or both.

In 1963, John purchased the Colonnades Hotel in Palm Beach Shores on Singer Island, Florida. Catherine lived with her husband in a modest apartment overlooking the parking lot, while John conducted his business from a corner table in the hotel's coffee shop.

When John D. MacArthur died on January 6, 1978, he was worth over $1 billion and reportedly one of the three wealthiest men in the United States.

Death

References

External links
 Biography at the John D. and Catherine T. MacArthur Foundation Website
People's Almanac Entry via (Trivia Library.Com)

1908 births
1981 deaths
American businesspeople in insurance
American people of Irish descent
Philanthropists from Illinois
People from Chicago
People from Palm Beach County, Florida
20th-century American businesspeople
20th-century American philanthropists